Convoz is an American online social networking service based in Houston, Texas which focuses on creating public collaborative conversation through video. It was founded by Hakeem Seriki and Glen Allison, under the parent company X Empire Inc. and was seeded by Upfront Ventures. The video-centric platform allows users to send 15-second clips directly to celebrities and they can then watch and choose which ones they want to respond to, sometimes broadcasting a message for all to see as well as livestreaming to their followers.

The startup has a total of seven employees, and has cultivated an undisclosed amount of seed funding from Greycroft Ventures, Upfront Ventures, 500 Startups, Precursor VC, Okapi Ventures, XG Ventures, and a roster of angels including Justin Kan, E-40 and Snoop Dogg.

Background
Convoz was announced to an investor and entrepreneur crowd at the Upfront Summit in Los Angeles by founder Hakeem Seriki in January 2018, in an attempt to raise capital for the app. In the presentation, Seriki announced that the video-centric platform aims to be "the place where you go to talk to people." He wants Convoz to be an app where people converse face-to-face with celebrities. It was revealed that Seriki approach Snoop Dogg to invest in the app, who also supported Seriki's presentation as well as rapper E-40 who was known for being an early investor in Clubhouse. The beta version of the app was officially released on January 30, 2018.

The app was officially unveiled on June 6, 2018, and many celebrities including Snoop Dogg, E-40, Big Boi, Trey Songz as well as sports players were using the app to communicate with fans.

In May 2019, the app was noted for its format of having short video messages that other users can watch and respond to in a study which demonstrated that
viewers are more responsive to lightweight content such as snapshots and video clips.

In June 2019, Seriki, E-40, and portfolio company Republic to invest $25,000 into a startup founded and managed by a woman or person of color as a marketing campaign to get more users to use the Convoz app. The conditions meant the entrants had to pitch their business idea on the Convoz app. In November of the same year, both investors held another competition on the app but this time increasing their investment fund to $100,000. Republic again facilitated the competition and Shark Tank star Daymond John served as a judge for the contest. The winner of the competition was Pierre Laguerre and it was announced in January 2020. His startup idea was "Fleeting Pro", a company that links certified class A & B drivers to trucking companies for scheduled, on-demand transportation needs.

As of 2023, Convoz operates with an invite-only registration and has a waiting list for new users on the app.

See also
 Cameo (website)
 Patreon

References

Sources
 Di Chen, Dustin Freeman, and Ravin Balakrishnan (2019). Integrating multimedia tools to enrich interactions in live streaming for language learning. Association for Computing Machinery. Retrieved January 14, 2023.

External links 
 

2018 establishments in the United States
2018 software
Android (operating system) software
Companies based in Houston
Internet properties established in 2018
IOS software
Mobile software
Image-sharing websites
Photo software
Proprietary cross-platform software
Symbian software
Video software
Celebrity
Video hosting
WatchOS software